Selian is a small river which runs off the southern slopes of Mount Meru in the northern Arusha region of Tanzania, East Africa. The town of Arusha resides to the east of Selian River.

References

Geography of Arusha Region
Rivers of Tanzania